The Enemy is a 1979 Turkish drama film, written, produced and co-directed by Yılmaz Güney with Zeki Ökten during Güney's second imprisonment, featuring Aytaç Arman as Ismail an overqualified young Turkish worker who unable to find employment is reduced to poisoning the local stray dogs and begging his father for part of his inheritance. The film was screened in competition for the Golden Bear at the 30th Berlin International Film Festival in 1980, where it won an Honourable Mention and the OCIC Award. It was also scheduled to compete in the cancelled 17th Antalya Golden Orange Film Festival, for which it received four Belated Golden Oranges, including Best Director, Best Actor and Best Actress.

Cast
 Aytaç Arman as Ismail
 Güngör Bayrak as Naciye
 Ahmet Açan as Diyarbakirli
 Sevket Altug as Abdullah
 Fehamet Atilla
 Hikmet Çelik
 Hasan Ceylan as Feyyat
 Lütfü Engin as Ismai's father
 Macit Koper as Ismail's brother
 Hüseyin Kutman as Sevket
 Güven Sengil as Nuri
 Kamil Sönmez as Rifat
 Muadelet Tibet as Ismail's mother
 Fehmi Yasar

Awards
30th Berlin International Film Festival
Honourable Mention 
OCIC Award
17th Antalya Golden Orange Film Festival
Belated Golden Orange for Best Director: Zeki Ökten (won, also for The Herd)
Belated Golden Orange for Best Actress: Güngör Bayrak (won, shared with Melike Demirağ for The Herd)
Belated Golden Orange for Best Actor: Aytaç Arman (won, shared with Tarık Akan for The Sacrifice and The Herd)
Belated Golden Orange for Best Supporting Actress: Fehamet Atila (won)

References

External links

1979 films
1979 drama films
Films set in Turkey
1970s Turkish-language films
Films directed by Zeki Ökten
Films directed by Yılmaz Güney
Turkish drama films